Jack Payne (born 13 September 1994) is an Australian rugby union player. Now retired, he finished his career playing for Newcastle Falcons in the English Premiership Rugby.

Payne previously played for the Scarlets regional team in Wales and is Welsh qualified. He also previously represented the Australia U20s rugby team. He started his career at flaker / second row. and moved to tighthead prop in 2016, where he eventually finished his career.

Payne made his debut for the Scarlets regional team in 2014 having played for Brothers Old Boys and Queensland Reds U20s side.

He joined Darlington Mowden Park in 2016 and caught the eye of Dean Richards. Payne then joined Newcastle Falcons at the beginning of the 2017–18 season.

He retired from professional rugby in 2019 due to head injuries.

References

External links 
Player - Jack PAYNE on It's Rugby 
Jack Payne England, ESPN

1994 births
Living people
Australian rugby union players
Rugby union players from Darwin, Northern Territory
Scarlets players
Rugby union props